Damien Jefferson (born October 3, 1997) is an American professional basketball player for the Memphis Hustle of the NBA G League. He played college basketball for the New Mexico Lobos and the Creighton Bluejays.

High school career
Jefferson attended Central High School in East Chicago, Indiana. As a senior, he averaged 26.1 points and 8.1 rebounds per game and was named The Times of Northwest Indiana Player of the Year. Jefferson led his team to a Class 4A sectional title and was named an Indiana All-Star. He committed to playing college basketball for New Mexico, his father's alma mater.

College career
Jefferson averaged 5.3 points and 2.3 rebounds as a freshman at New Mexico. For his sophomore season, he transferred to Creighton and sat out for one year due to transfer rules. As a sophomore, Jefferson averaged 6.2 points and four rebounds per game. In his junior season, he averaged 9.4 points and 5.5 rebounds per game. Jefferson declared for the 2020 NBA draft before withdrawing and returning to college. On December 17, 2020, he flirted with a triple-double, recording 10 points, 10 rebounds and eight assists in a 94–76 win over St. John's. As a senior, Jefferson earned Second Team All-Big East honors. He averaged 11.9 points and 5.4 rebounds per game. Jefferson declared for the 2021 NBA draft, forgoing an additional season of eligibility the NCAA granted due to the COVID-19 pandemic.

Professional career
Jefferson joined the Sacramento Kings for the 2021 NBA Summer League, winning a summer league championship. He joined the Stockton Kings as an affiliate player. Jefferson was then later waived on January 29, 2022. He was acquired by the Memphis Hustle on February 14.

Career statistics

College

|-
| style="text-align:left;"| 2016–17
| style="text-align:left;"| New Mexico
| 29 || 6 || 15.1 || .438 || .214 || .490 || 2.3 || 1.0 || .4 || .1 || 5.3
|-
| style="text-align:left;"| 2017–18
| style="text-align:left;"| Creighton
| style="text-align:center;" colspan="11"|  Redshirt
|-
| style="text-align:left;"| 2018–19
| style="text-align:left;"| Creighton
| 26 || 16 || 18.0 || .535 || .412 || .634 || 4.0 || .8 || .4 || .1 || 6.2
|-
| style="text-align:left;"| 2019–20
| style="text-align:left;"| Creighton
| 30 || 29 || 27.1 || .533 || .217 || .635 || 5.5 || 1.4 || .6 || .2 || 9.4
|-
| style="text-align:left;"| 2020–21
| style="text-align:left;"| Creighton
| 31 || 31 || 30.9 || .512 || .348 || .605 || 5.4 || 2.4 || 1.2 || .3 || 11.9
|- class="sortbottom"
| style="text-align:center;" colspan="2"| Career
| 116 || 82 || 23.0 || .509 || .304 || .592 || 4.4 || 1.4 || .7 || .2 || 8.3

Personal life
Jefferson's father, Everette, played college basketball at New Mexico.

References

External links
Creighton Bluejays bio
New Mexico Lobos bio

1997 births
Living people
American men's basketball players
Basketball players from Indiana
Creighton Bluejays men's basketball players
New Mexico Lobos men's basketball players
Small forwards
Sportspeople from East Chicago, Indiana
Stockton Kings players